Litrisa is a genus of flowering plants in the tribe Eupatorieae within the family Asteraceae.

Some taxonomists group Litrisa and Trilisa into the genus Carphephorus.

Species
There is only one known species, Litrisa carnosa, called pineland chaffhead, native to the State of Florida in the United States. It is a shrub up to 90 cm (3 feet) tall, covered with many small hairs and producing flat-topped inflorescences of many small purplish flower heads.

References

Eupatorieae
Endemic flora of Florida
Monotypic Asteraceae genera
Taxa named by John Kunkel Small